John Lilley (born March 3, 1954) is an American guitarist, singer, songwriter, guitar teacher and landscape gardener, best known for being a member of rock band The Hooters.

Early life
John Lilley learned to play the guitar at nine years old after he saw The Beatles perform on The Ed Sullivan Show on February 9, 1964.  He initially learned to play jazz and folk music, with his first teacher being folk and bluegrass expert Jerry Ricks.  He eventually studied jazz improvisation with Dennis Sandole and then jazz, theory, orchestration, composition and arranging with Calvin Harris.  Lilley also participated in visual arts, drawing voraciously while in school and mostly painting as an adult.

In his twenties during the mid-1970s, Lilley got involved in the local Philadelphia rock music scene, as the manager and guitarist of the Get Right Band and later became the guitarist for Robert Hazard and the Heroes, who went on to write Cyndi Lauper's hit "Girls Just Wanna Have Fun." For a brief time in the late 1970s, Lilley sold ads for a local monthly periodical, County Lines magazine.

Tenure with The Hooters
After a sudden and unexpected departure from the Heroes, Lilley joined another local Philadelphia band, The Hooters, in 1983. The band combined reggae, ska, and rock'n'roll in their music.

Nervous Night, The Hooters' 1985 debut on Columbia Records, sold in excess of 2 million copies and included Billboard Top 40 hits "Day By Day" (#18), "And We Danced" (#21) and "Where Do The Children Go" (#38).

After releasing six albums, The Hooters obtained a large global following throughout the 1980s and 1990s. As a result, they were asked to open three major musical events of the late 20th century: Live Aid in Philadelphia in 1985, Amnesty International Concert at Giants Stadium in 1986, and Roger Waters' The Wall Concert in Berlin in 1990. In 1995, The Hooters went on hiatus.

Lilley reunited with The Hooters on successful headlining European summer tours in 2003, 2004 and 2005.

2007 saw the release of Time Stand Still, their first album of new material since 1993.

Other musical projects
When Lilley has not worked with The Hooters, he has composed and performed several theatre and dance scores.

Sister Carrie, adapted by Louis Lippa and based on Theodore Dreiser's novel, was performed at the People's Light and Theatre Company in Malvern, Pennsylvania in 1991 and included over 125 musical moments and themes throughout the 6 hour play that Lilley contributed to.

At the Edinburgh Festival Fringe in 1992, Lilley contributed to Collecting Gravity by the Terry Beck Dance Troupe.

Lilley has also worked on commercials for Raisin Bran, Clinique and American Express.

Currently, Lilley is teaching guitar lessons to students in the Philadelphia area.

His solo debut CD Lucky Kinda Guy, which he described "as a blend of rock and country with an Americana edge," was released on October 6, 2009.

He also put out  an  EP album out with John Lilley as   Guitar Composer Producer , Daniel Gallery as the  Composer and Keyboards and  Brent Edmondson the bassist Composer Engineer

Avantgardeners
When The Hooters went on hiatus in 1995, Lilley left the music business and concentrated on a career in landscape gardening.  He started his own company in the Philadelphia area, Avantgardeners, which evolved from a one-man operation to a full-time business employing several workers and having its own nursery.

External links

John Lilley official MySpace page

Living people
1954 births
American male singers
American rock singers
American rock guitarists
American male guitarists
Guitarists from Philadelphia
The Hooters members
20th-century American guitarists
20th-century American male musicians